General Sir George James Giffard  (27 September 1886 – 17 November 1964) was a British military officer, who had a distinguished career in command of African troops in World War I, rising to command an Army Group in South East Asia in World War II.

Early career
Giffard was the eldest son of George Campbell Giffard, Clerk of the Journals, House of Commons, and Jane Lawrence, granddaughter of the Vice-Chancellor Sir James Bacon. He was thus a nephew of the Socialist politician Susan Lawrence. After attending Rugby School and the Royal Military College, Sandhurst, he was commissioned into the Queen's Royal West Surrey Regiment in 1906. In 1913, while serving with its 1st Battalion, he saw action in East Africa. He transferred into a unit of the King's African Rifles.

Giffard saw active service in World War I, his unit serving in the East Africa campaign against the German colonial forces (Schutztruppe) under Lettow-Vorbeck. He rose to command a column of two battalions of the KAR, "Gifcol". Highly respected and lauded by his own soldiers, an Australian scout under his command commented that Giffard was "an efficient and tireless soldier, [who] expected his officers and men to be the same". He was also wounded, was awarded the DSO, and was mentioned in despatches four times. Although Lettow-Vorbeck's forces were never rounded up, Gifcol was nevertheless the most effective unit involved in the efforts to pursue and capture them, and came close to destroying the remaining Schutztruppe during the Battle of Lioma in 1918.

After the war, Giffard attended the Staff College, Camberley from 1919 to 1920. On graduating, he joined the Royal West African Frontier Force. In 1927 he participated in the Shanghai Expeditionary Force as the Second-in-Command of the 1st Battalion the Queen's Royal West Surrey Regiment. The following year, he was appointed an Instructor at the Staff College, Camberley, and then in 1931 attended the Imperial Defence College, and later became Commanding Officer of the 2nd Battalion, Queen's Royal Surrey Regiment at Aldershot. In 1933 he became a General Staff Officer, Grade 1 (GSO1) (effectively the Chief of Staff) of the British 2nd Infantry Division.

Giffard returned to West Africa in 1936, when he was appointed Inspector-General of the West African Frontier Force. He was appointed Inspector-General of African Colonial Forces in 1938.

Second World War

Giffard began the Second World War as Military Secretary at the War Office, and then, from 1940, was General Officer Commanding British Forces in Palestine and Trans-Jordan.

In 1941 he became Commander-in-Chief of the West Africa Command. While the Mediterranean was barred to British shipping by German and Italian naval and air force units, West Africa was an important link in Allied lines of communication to the Middle East and the Far East. In addition to organising the logistic infrastructure, Giffard's major achievement was the reorganisation of the units of the Royal West African Frontier Force into two field infantry divisions, capable of serving as independent forces in rough terrain. Initially, this was in response to a potential threat from Vichy French forces in Senegal and Niger. Later, these two divisions, 81st (West Africa) Division and 82nd (West Africa) Division served with distinction in the Burma Campaign.

He was made General Officer Commanding, Eastern Army, in India, in May 1943. This army faced the Japanese army which had occupied Burma. Several sources, notably Field Marshal William "Bill" Slim, testified to his contribution to the improvement in morale and effectiveness in Eastern Army during this period.

In October 1943 he was appointed Commander in Chief of 11th Army Group in India and Burma, effectively being commander in chief of land forces in the South East Asia Command. His period of command here was less happy. He was temperamentally the opposite of the publicity-hungry Commander in Chief, Admiral Louis Mountbatten, and the two men often clashed. He and the United States General Joseph Stilwell also disliked each other. Stilwell, as commander of the Northern Combat Area Command, refused to take Giffard's orders, claiming that he could not submit American forces to British control, and as Deputy Supreme Commander to Mountbatten he was in any case Giffard's superior. The resulting command arrangement was an awkward compromise. 

In March 1944, relations between Mountbatten and Giffard broke during a crisis at the start of the Battle of Imphal. Mountbatten acted decisively to obtain transport aircraft from the United States Army Air Force to fly reinforcements and supplies to the isolated Allied troops at Imphal. Mountbatten's Chief of Staff, Lieutenant-General Henry Pownall, wrote that Giffard had shown no initiative at all. Giffard was notified of his dismissal in May, but was asked to remain in post until his successor, Lieutenant-General Oliver Leese, could relieve him. As a result, he remained until October.

Other appointments
In 1945, he was made Colonel of the Queen's Royal Regiment. He was also Colonel Commandant of the Royal West African Frontier Force and of the King's African Rifles. Giffard was also Aide-de-Camp General to the King from 1943 to 1946. He retired in 1946.

Honours and awards
 Knight Grand Cross of the Order of the Bath - 1 January 1944 (KCB - 1 January 1941, CB - 1 January 1938)
 Distinguished Service Order - 4 June 1917, for distinguished service in the field
 Mentioned in Despatches - 1 April 1941 (for service in the Middle East August 1939-November 1940), 26 October 1944 (for service in Burma & Eastern Frontier of India)
 Order of Polonia Restituta, 1st Class - 14 December 1943
 Croix de Guerre (France) - 31 August 1917

References

Bibliography

External links
 British Military History Biographies G
Generals of World War II

|-

|-
 

|-
 

|-

|-

People from Englefield Green
1886 births
1964 deaths
British Army generals
British Army generals of World War II
Knights Grand Cross of the Order of the Bath
Companions of the Distinguished Service Order
Grand Crosses of the Order of Polonia Restituta
Recipients of the Croix de Guerre 1914–1918 (France)
Queen's Royal Regiment officers
King's African Rifles officers
British Army personnel of World War I
People educated at Rugby School
Graduates of the Royal Military College, Sandhurst
Graduates of the Staff College, Camberley
War Office personnel in World War II
Graduates of the Royal College of Defence Studies
Academics of the Staff College, Camberley
Military personnel from Surrey